Jos van Emden (born 18 February 1985) is a Dutch professional road bicycle racer, who rides for UCI WorldTeam . He is known as a time-trial specialist.

Career
Born in Schiedam, Van Emden started racing in 2005. During his second year, he won four stages in three different races, became the overall winner of two other stage races and finished seventh in the under-23 road race at the 2006 UCI Road World Championships. The next year, he achieved his first professional victory when he won the Münsterland Giro.

His debut in a Grand Tour came in 2009, when he took part in the Giro d'Italia. One year later, he finished ninth in two different stages of that same race, and achieved two time-trial victories in one week, winning the prologues of the Delta Tour Zeeland and the Ster ZLM Toer. Later that year, he was the winner of the Dutch National Time Trial Championships.

Van Emden made international headlines when he proposed to his girlfriend during a time-trial stage of the 2014 Giro d'Italia. After she accepted, he finished the stage 120th out of 156 starters.

In 2015, Van Emden finished second in the time trial stage of the Tour of California, sitting in the leader's hot seat all day before being beaten by Peter Sagan. Two months later, Van Emden participated in his first Tour de France; he finished fifth in the opening time-trial that took place in his home country. His biggest victory for the time being came when he won the time trial stage of the Eneco Tour, subsequently gaining the right to wear the leader's jersey.

He was named in the startlist for the 2016 Vuelta a España.

In 2019 Van Emden won the Dutch National Time Trial Championships for the second time.

Major results
Source: 

 2006
 1st  Overall Roserittet DNV GP
1st Stage 1
 1st  Overall Triptyque des Barrages
1st Stage 2 (ITT)
 Grand Prix Guillaume Tell
1st Prologue & Stage 1
 1st Stage 1 Tour du Loir-et-Cher
 3rd Overall Tour de Normandie
1st Stage 4
 3rd Ronde van Overijssel
 National Under-23 Road Championships
4th Time trial
5th Road race
 4th Paris–Tours Espoirs
 5th Omloop van het Waasland
 6th Ronde van Noord-Holland
 7th Road race, UCI Under-23 Road World Championships
 8th Time trial, UEC European Under-23 Road Championships
2007
 1st Münsterland Giro
 1st Prologue (TTT) Tour Alsace
 National Under-23 Road Championships
2nd Time trial
3rd Road race
2008
 1st Stage 1 Rhône-Alpes Isère Tour
 1st Stage 5 Vuelta Ciclista a León
 5th Overall Olympia's Tour
 5th Ronde van Drenthe
 7th Overall Le Triptyque des Monts et Châteaux
 7th Halle–Ingooigem
 8th Overall Tour de Normandie
1st Stage 7
 9th Overall Boucles de la Mayenne
2009
 8th Kampioenschap van Vlaanderen
 10th Overall Sachsen Tour
2010
 1st  Time trial, National Road Championships
 1st Prologue Ster ZLM Toer
 2nd Overall Delta Tour Zeeland
1st  Young rider classification
1st Prologue
 2nd Hel van het Mergelland
2011
 1st Stadsprijs Geraardsbergen
 3rd Overall Delta Tour Zeeland
1st Prologue
 5th Overall Eneco Tour
2013
 1st Münsterland Giro
 4th Overall Tour of Hainan
2014
 3rd Time trial, National Road Championships
 3rd Arnhem–Veenendaal Classic
 9th Overall Ster ZLM Toer
 10th Paris–Tours
2015
 1st Stage 4 (ITT) Eneco Tour
 3rd Time trial, National Road Championships
 6th Overall Tour du Poitou-Charentes
2016
 2nd Time trial, National Road Championships
 3rd Overall Ster ZLM Toer
1st Stage 1 (ITT)
 5th Overall Eneco Tour
 8th Time trial, UCI Road World Championships
2017
 1st Dwars door West-Vlaanderen
 1st Stage 21 (ITT) Giro d'Italia
 4th Time trial, National Road Championships
 5th Time trial, UEC European Road Championships
 6th Overall Tour of Britain
 8th Le Samyn
2018
 1st Stage 5 (TTT) Tour of Britain
 5th Time trial, National Road Championships
 8th Time trial, UEC European Road Championships
 10th Paris–Tours
2019
 1st  Team relay, UCI Road World Championships
 1st  Time trial, National Road Championships
 1st Chrono des Nations
 1st Stage 1 (TTT) UAE Tour
 3rd Binche–Chimay–Binche
 7th Overall ZLM Tour
1st Prologue
 8th Time trial, UEC European Road Championships
2020
 5th Road race, National Road Championships
2021
 2nd  Team relay, UCI Road World Championships
 3rd  Team relay, UEC European Road Championships
2022
 4th Time trial, National Road Championships
 9th Time trial, UEC European Road Championships

Grand Tour general classification results timeline

Major championship results

References

External links

  
 
 
 
 
 

1985 births
Living people
Dutch male cyclists
Dutch cycling time trial champions
Dutch Giro d'Italia stage winners
UCI Road World Championships cyclists for the Netherlands
Sportspeople from Schiedam
Cyclists from South Holland
UCI Road World Champions (elite men)